Bruno Miguel de Azevedo Gaspar de Carvalho  better known as Bruno de Carvalho (born 8 February 1972) is a Portuguese  sports commentator and DJ who was the 42nd president of sports club Sporting CP from 2013 to 2018. He became the first Sporting president to be dismissed by associates of the club, four months after being re-elected with 87% of votes.

Before Sporting
In March 2009, Carvalho founded and presided Fundação de Solidariedade Social Aragão Pinto, a foundation dedicated to support the social integration of at-risk youth through sports. In the first year of activity, the foundation helped over 1200 children through partnerships with local sporting clubs and associations representing 15 different sporting activities.

On 27 March 2011, Carvalho was a candidate to the presidency of Sporting but eventually lost the elections to Godinho Lopes. During the election night Carvalho, despite winning the popular vote with over 1500 more voters lost for a mere 360 votes. Due to this, Godinho Lopes, as president elect, was not able to speak to the crowd of associates waiting for the results and it was Carvalho that managed to calm the crowd down. The election results were contested by Carvalho with allegations of irregularities as well as requests for a recount having been rejected by the General Assembly President of the club at the time, Lino de Castro.

President of Sporting CP
On 24 March 2013, again a candidate, Carvalho won the club elections and became the 42nd president of Sporting. Four years later, on 4 March 2017, he was re-elected with 86.13% of the votes, defeating Pedro Madeira Rodrigues, who got 9.49%, in a total of 18,755 voters, a record in the club's history. He had been compared to Donald Trump by Jack Pitt-Brooke of The Independent newspaper three days before.

Carvalho's presidency had a number of successes, which consolidated his popularity that lead to his re-election in 2017. Financially, Carvalho recovered the near-bankruptcy club by negotiating a debt restructuring plan with banking institution within the first month. Further, Carvalho during the next few years reduced liabilities and consolidated payroll costs sustaining the growth. Simultaneously, negotiated a substantial 515 Million Euro TV rights contract with NOS and first reached positive shareholder's equity in the 2014/2015 exercise, the second exercise of his mandate.

Carvalho was also noteworthy for his calls to action on issues pertaining the business of football namely the implementation of VAR, making TPO illegal, making referees performance review public or making referees adequately paid. These and other subjects were matter of discussion in several international conferences called "The Future of Football" organized yearly during Carvalho's presidency

Carvalho while in Sporting inaugurated Sporting TV and Pavilhão João Rocha both long-standing wishes by Sporting's associates. This, along with a resurgence in the competitiveness of the club's sports, the number of Sporting associates doubled during his time as president, reaching 160 thousand and becoming the third club in the world in that metric, behind Bayern Munich and rivals Benfica.

Destitution and aftermath
However, as a result of several incidents throughout his mandates as well as negative results in football at the end of the 2017–18 season, including the termination of contract by nine footballers, Carvalho was dismissed as president after 71.36% of club members voted him out in a general assembly held at Altice Arena on 23 June 2018. Hours later, on 24 June, he posted a message on his Facebook page saying that he was no longer both a member and a supporter of Sporting. Nevertheless, in less than 14 hours, he withdrew the statement.

On 11 November 2018, Carvalho was detained at home for suspicion of giving permission to the violent attack by Sporting supporters on players and manager of the main football team at the club's training facilities on 15 May 2018. On 15 November, the Portuguese Public Ministry charged Carvalho with terrorism and 98 other crimes, which include aggravated threat (40), kidnapping (38), qualified offence to physical integrity (19), and possession of prohibited weapon.

On 6 July 2019, Carvalho was expelled as member of Sporting.

On 11 March 2020, the state prosecutor in Carvalho's trial recognized that there was no evidence corroborating the accusation of Carvalho, leading to a recommendation to be deemed innocent by the judge. In January 2021, Carvalho sued Cofina for alleged defamatory publications related to the attack at Sporting training academy and to Cashball, an alleged corruption case involving Sporting.

References

  

1972 births
Living people
People from Maputo
Sporting CP presidents